The following lists events that happened during 1988 in Cape Verde.

Incumbents
President: Aristides Pereira
Prime Minister: Pedro Pires

Events
Cabopress, the national news agency established 
Newspaper Jornal O Cidadão established in Mindelo
Jornal Horizonte, a newspaper established in Praia
December 31: The National Historic Archives of Cape Verde established

Sports
CS Mindelense won the Cape Verdean Football Championship

Births
January 5: Kay, footballer
January 31: Fredson Rodrigues, footballer
February 4: Edson Cruz, footballer
February 24: Gegé, footballer
April 18: Tino Santos, footballer
May 6: Sténio, footballer
May 20: Stopira, footballer
May 25: Dany Mendes Ribeiro, footballer
July 10: Nivaldo Alves Freitas Santos, footballer
August 29: Delmiro, footballer
October 13: Hélder Samir Lopes Semedo Fernandes, footballer
October 22: Cabral, footballer
October 29: Adilson Vaz, footballer
November 9: Valter Borges, footballer
November 14: Héldon Ramos, footballer
November 19: Júlio Tavares, footballer

References

 
Years of the 20th century in Cape Verde
1980s in Cape Verde
Cape Verde
Cape Verde